Nail in the Boot is a 1931 Soviet drama film directed by Mikhail Kalatozov

Plot 
The worker does not manage to have time to transmit the report during the training maneuvers because of poor-quality boots and the gas attack destroys the crew of the armored train. The worker is accused of the tragedy, but the tribunal is actually to blame, since it includes people who made defective shoes.

Starring 
 Aleksandre Jaliashvili
 Siko Palavandishvili
 Akaki Khorava
 Arkadi Khintibidze

References

External links 

1931 films
1930s Russian-language films
1931 drama films
Soviet black-and-white films
Soviet drama films